Adrenaline Rush may refer to:

 Adrenaline Rush (album), the 1997 album by rap artist Twista
 Adrenaline Rush 2007, the 2007 album by Twista
 Adrenaline Rush (film), a 2002 IMAX film about base jumping
 "Adrenaline Rush" a song by rapper Obie Trice off the 8 Mile soundtrack
 Adrenaline Rush Project, a nonprofit organization
 Adrenaline RUSH, an American professional wrestling stable consisting primarily of A.C.H. and TaDarius Thomas

See also
 Adrenaline junkie
 Acute stress reaction
 Panic attack
 Posttraumatic stress disorder
 Rest and digest
 Stressor
 Tend and befriend
 Vasoconstriction
 Fight-or-flight response